is a Japanese football player. She plays for Sanfrecce Hiroshima Regina. She played for Japan national team.

Club career
Nakamura was born in Iwate Prefecture on August 3, 1991. After graduating from high school, she joined Albirex Niigata in 2010.

National team career
In 2017, Nakamura was selected Japan national team for 2017 Algarve Cup. At this competition, on March 3, she debuted against Iceland. She played 3 games for Japan in 2017.

National team statistics

References

External links

Japan Football Association
Albirex Niigata

1991 births
Living people
Association football people from Iwate Prefecture
Japanese women's footballers
Japan women's international footballers
Nadeshiko League players
Albirex Niigata Ladies players
Women's association football defenders
Sanfrecce Hiroshima Regina players